Dolores, officially the Municipality of Dolores, is a 5th class municipality in the province of Abra, Philippines. According to the 2020 census, it has a population of 11,512 people.

History

The place was called Bucao, named after the first Tingguian (Itneg) chieftain who settled in the place long before Spanish colonization. It used to be part of the Municipality of Tayum. In 1882, upon the recommendation of the parish priest of Tayum, Fr. Pío Mercado, and the Teniente Bazar of Bucao, Don Ignacio Eduarte, Bucao was created as a separate pueblo. In 1885, Bucao was renamed Dolores, to honor its patron saint, Nuestra Señora de los Dolores (Our Lady Of Sorrows). The first gobernadorcillo of the town was Don Rosalio Eduarte.

Geography

According to the Philippine Statistics Authority, the municipality has a land area of  constituting  of the  total area of Abra.

Barangays
Dolores is politically subdivided into 15 barangays. These barangays are headed by elected officials: Barangay Captain, Barangay Council, whose members are called Barangay Councilors. All are elected every three years.

Climate

Demographics

In the 2020 census, Dolores had a population of 11,512.

Economy

Government
Dolores, belonging to the lone congressional district of the province of Abra, is governed by a mayor designated as its local chief executive and by a municipal council as its legislative body in accordance with the Local Government Code. The mayor, vice mayor, and the councilors are elected directly by the people through an election which is being held every three years.

Elected officials

References

External links

 
 [ Philippine Standard Geographic Code]

Municipalities of Abra (province)
Populated places on the Abra River